Tobias Kreuzmann (born 15 June 1981, in Duisburg) is a German water polo player who competed in the 2004 Summer Olympics and in the 2008 Summer Olympics.

See also
 Germany men's Olympic water polo team records and statistics

References

External links
 

1981 births
Living people
German male water polo players
Olympic water polo players of Germany
Water polo players at the 2004 Summer Olympics
Water polo players at the 2008 Summer Olympics
Sportspeople from Duisburg
21st-century German people